This is a list of schools in Futian District, Shenzhen.

Shenzhen municipal schools
Schools operated by the Shenzhen municipal government in Futian District include:
Shenzhen Senior High School - Central Campus (中心校区) and the South Campus (南校区)
Shenzhen Experimental School
Shenzhen Foreign Languages School Junior High School Division
 (深圳市第三高级中学) Junior High School Division
 (深圳艺术学校) - Baishaling
The First Vocational Technical School of Shenzhen (深圳市第一职业技术学校)
Shenzhen Pengcheng Technical College (深圳鹏城技师学院), previously Shenzhen Second Senior Technical School (深圳市技工学校) - Fuqiang and Qiaocheng campuses

Futian district schools

Twelve-year schools

 Shenzhen Huangyuyuan School
 Shenzhen Yaohua Experimental School
 Shenzhen Yunding School

Secondary schools

Futian Foreign Languages High School
Shenzhen Fujing Foreign Language School - It was created in April 1999 and in 2018 it had over 2,000 students.
 - In 2018 it had about 2,600 students. It has a  campus.
Shenzhen Futian BeiHuan Middle School
Shenzhen Futian Hongling Middle School
Shenzhen Futian Huafu Middle School
Shenzhen Futian Huanggang Middle School
 
Shenzhen Futian Meilin Middle School
Shenzhen Futian Meishan Middle School 
Shenzhen Futian Science Middle School
Shenzhen Futian Shangbu Middle School
Shenzhen Futian Shangsha Middle School
Shenzhen Futian Xinzhou Middle School
Shenzhen Yongyuan Experimental School (沪教院福田实验学校??)

Vocational schools
 Shenzhen Futian Huaqiang Vocational and Technical School

Nine-year schools

 Futian Foreign Language School of Shenzhen China (Jingtian Campus and Qiaoxiang Campus)
 Futian Qiaoxiang Foreign Language School
 Green Oasis School
 Shenzhen Futian Caitian School
 Shenzhen Futian Funful Bilingual School
 Shenzhen Futian Huangpu School (primary school and middle school)
 Shenzhen Futian Nan Hua Experimental School
 Shenzhen Futian Shixia School
 Shenzhen Futian Yitian Garden School
 Shenzhen Hanlin Experimental School
 Shenzhen Nankai School

Primary schools

 The Affiliated Elementary School of SFAES
 Futian Bonded Trade Zone Foreign Languages Primary School
 The Second Affiliated Elementary School of SFAES
 Shenzhen Arts School Futian Tairan Primary School
 Shenzhen Baihua Primary School
 Shenzhen Futian Primary School
 Shenzhen Futian Donghai Experimental Primary School
 Shenzhen Futian Fuhua Primary School 
 Shenzhen Futian Fumin Primary School
 Shenzhen Futian Funan Primary School
 Shenzhen Futian Fuqiang Primary School
 Shenzhen Futian Fuxin Primary School
 Shenzhen Futian Gangxia Primary School
 Shenzhen Futian Huafu Primary School - Huafu Village
 Shenzhen Futian Huaxin Primary School
 Shenzhen Futian Huanggang Primary School
 Shenzhen Futian Jinglian Primary School
 Shenzhen Futian Jinglong Primary School
 Shenzhen Futian Jingpeng Primary School
 Shenzhen Futian Jingtian Primary School
 Shenzhen Futian Jingxiu Primary School
 Shenzhen Futian Lianhua Primary School
 Shenzhen Futian Liyuan Primary School (Baihua Campus/Baishaling Campus, Tongxinling Campus, Weipeng Campus, and Zhongfu Campus)
 Shenzhen Futian Li Yuan Foreign Language Primary School (Shiling Campus, Tianqiao Campus, Xiangmi Campus, and Xiangyu Campus)
 Shenzhen Futian Lizhong Primary School
 Shenzhen Futian Lüzhou Primary School
 Shenzhen Futian Meihua Primary School
 Shenzhen Futian Meili Primary School
 Shenzhen Futian Meilin Primary School - Xiameilin Subdistrict
 Shenzhen Futian Meishan Primary School
 Shenzhen Futian Meiyuan Primary School
 Shenzhen Futian Meilian Primary School
 Shenzhen Futian Nanhua Primary School - Huaqiangnan Subdistrict
 Shenzhen Futian Nanyuan Primary School
 Shenzhen Futian Quanhai Primary School
 Shenzhen Futian Shangbu Primary School
 Shenzhen Futian Shangsha Primary School
 Shenzhen Futian Shiling Primary School
 Shenzhen Futian Shuiwei Primary School
 Shenzhen Futian Tianjian Primary School
 Shenzhen Futian Xiasha Primary School
 Shenzhen Futian Xinlian Primary School
 Shenzhen Futian Xinsha Primary School
 Shenzhen Futian Xinzhou Primary School
 Shenzhen Futian Yiqiang Primary School
 Shenzhen Futian Yitian Primary School
 Shenzhen Futian Yuanling Experimental Primary School
 Shenzhen Futian Yuanling Foreign Language Primary School
 Shenzhen Futian Yuanling Primary School
 Shenzhen Futian Zhongfu Primary School
 Shenzhen Mingde Experimental School (Bihai Campus and Xiangmi Campus)

International and private schools
QSI International School of Shenzhen previously had a campus in Honeylake, Futian District, adjacent to the Shenzhen Celebrities Club.

Notes

References

Futian
Futian District